The Men's Downhill B1 was one of the events held in Alpine skiing at the 1988 Winter Paralympics in Innsbruck.

There were 10 competitors in the final.

Austria's Franz Griessbacher set a time of 1:10.43, taking the gold medal, the first of two for him.

Willi Hohm won his only Paralympic medal at this event, having previously competed in several events at the 1976 Winter Paralympics and 1984 Winter Paralympics.

Results

Final

References 

Downhill